Hilal Elver is a member of the Academic Council of the UN Least Developed Countries (2011-2021) and was the United Nations Special Rapporteur on the Right to Food from 2 June 2014 until 1 May 2020. She is also a research professor at University of California, Santa Barbara and Global Distinguished Fellow at the Resnick Food Law and Policy Center UCLA Law School.

The United States was not happy with her appointment as Special Rapporteur, citing: 

Canadian Foreign Minister John Baird also spoke out, notifying UNHRC president Baudelaire Ndong Ella that her "public record clearly demonstrates abysmal judgment, as well as associations with fringe groups."

Elver is married to Richard A. Falk.

Education
J.D. University of Ankara Law School, 1974
Ph.D. in Law, University of Ankara, 1985
S.J.D. UCLA School of Law, 2009

Publications

 Reimagining Climate Change, Routledge 2016 (co-editor, Paul Wapner)

References

United Nations special rapporteurs
UCLA School of Law alumni
University of California, Santa Barbara faculty
Living people
Turkish women diplomats
Year of birth missing (living people)